The Last Wagon can refer to:

 The Last Wagon (1943 film), an Italian comedy directed by Mario Mattoli
 The Last Wagon (1956 film), an American western starring Richard Widmark and directed by Delmer Daves